Fredrik Sjøvold (born 17 August 2003) is a Norwegian footballer who plays for FK Bodø/Glimt in the Eliteserien, the Norwegian top division.

Career
Sjøvold was in the youth system at Rosenborg but made the decision to develop his game in the Norwegian third division with Tiller IL, choosing to play senior football rather than continuing with youth football with Rosenborg. After impressing for Tiller in 2021 many options were open for Sjøvold and he signed with FK Bodø/Glimt in January 2022 signing a contract until 2025.

He made his professional debut for Bodø/Glimt when appearing as a substitute in an Eliteserien league match against FK Jerv on 23 July, 2022 in a 5-0 victory at the Aspmyra Stadion.

References

2003 births
Living people
Norwegian footballers
Association football midfielders
Eliteserien players
FK Bodø/Glimt players